Two Mile and Two and One-Half Mile Village is a designated place within the Town of Watson Lake in southeast Yukon, Canada that includes the Indian settlements of Two Mile Village and Two and One-Half Mile Village.

History 
Two Mile Village and Two and One-Half Mile Village were both separate Indian settlements prior to forming Two Mile and Two and One-Half Mile Village on January 2, 2011. It was subsequently annexed by the Town of Watson Lake on January 2, 2016.

Geography 
Two Mile and Two and One-Half Mile Village is within the Town of Watson Lake on the Robert Campbell Highway (Highway 4) in southeast Yukon.

Demographics 

See also 
List of communities in Yukon

References 

Designated places in Yukon